Levilactobacillus is a genus of lactic acid bacteria.

Species
The genus Levilactobacillus comprises the following species:
 Levilactobacillus acidifarinae (Vancanneyt et al. 2005) Zheng et al. 2020
 Levilactobacillus angrenensis (Long et al. 2020) Zheng et al. 2020
 Levilactobacillus bambusae (Guu et al. 2018) Zheng et al. 2020
 Levilactobacillus brevis (Orla-Jensen 1919) Zheng et al. 2020
 Levilactobacillus cerevisiae (Koob et al. 2017) Zheng et al. 2020
 Levilactobacillus enshiensis (Zhang et al. 2020) Zheng et al. 2020
 Levilactobacillus fujinensis (Long and Gu 2019) Zheng et al. 2020
 Levilactobacillus fuyuanensis (Long and Gu 2019) Zheng et al. 2020
 Levilactobacillus hammesii (Valcheva et al. 2005) Zheng et al. 2020
 Levilactobacillus huananensis (Long and Gu 2019) Zheng et al. 2020
 Levilactobacillus koreensis (Bui et al. 2011) Zheng et al. 2020
 Levilactobacillus lindianensis (Long and Gu 2019) Zheng et al. 2020
 Levilactobacillus mulengensis (Long and Gu 2019) Zheng et al. 2020
 Levilactobacillus namurensis (Scheirlinck et al. 2007) Zheng et al. 2020
 Levilactobacillus parabrevis (Vancanneyt et al. 2006) Zheng et al. 2020
 Levilactobacillus paucivorans (Ehrmann et al. 2010) Zheng et al. 2020
 Levilactobacillus senmaizukei (Hiraga et al. 2008) Zheng et al. 2020
 Levilactobacillus spicheri (Meroth et al. 2004) Zheng et al. 2020
 Levilactobacillus suantsaii (Liou et al. 2019) Zheng et al. 2020
 Levilactobacillus suantsaiihabitans Zheng et al. 2020
 Levilactobacillus tangyuanensis (Long and Gu 2019) Zheng et al. 2020
 Levilactobacillus tongjiangensis (Long and Gu 2019) Zheng et al. 2020
 Levilactobacillus yonginensis (Yi et al. 2013) Zheng et al. 2020
 Levilactobacillus zymae (Vancanneyt et al. 2005) Zheng et al. 2020

Phylogeny
The currently accepted taxonomy is based on the List of Prokaryotic names with Standing in Nomenclature and the phylogeny is based on whole-genome sequences.

References

Lactobacillaceae
Bacteria genera